Damone may refer to:

 Damone (band), an American hard rock/glam metal band
 Damone (given name)
 Damone, one of the 50 daughters of Danaus in Greek mythology

People with the surname
 Vic Damone (1928–2018), American singer